Nicholas Fish (by 1518 – 1558 or later), of Canterbury and Fordwich, Kent, was an English politician.

Career
In November 1554, he was a Member of Parliament for Canterbury.

References

1558 deaths
English MPs 1554–1555
People from Canterbury
Year of birth uncertain